Thomas Watson (1 January 1874 – 3 August 1936) was an Australian rules footballer who played with Carlton and Melbourne in the Victorian Football League (VFL).

Notes

External links 

Tom Watson's profile at Blueseum

		
		
1874 births	
1920 deaths
VFL/AFL players born outside Australia
Australian rules footballers from Victoria (Australia)		
Carlton Football Club players		
Melbourne Football Club players